Strophanthus amboensis is a plant in the dogbane family Apocynaceae.

Description
Its flowers feature an orange-yellow turning purple corolla tube, white-streaked on the inside.

Distribution and habitat
Strophanthus amboensis is native to the Democratic Republic of the Congo, Angola and Namibia. Its habitats are forest margins, scrubland or rock fissures, from  altitude.

Uses
Strophanthus amboensis is used in local traditional medicine treatments for rheumatism, venereal diseases and scabies. The plant has been used as arrow poison.

References

amboensis
Plants used in traditional African medicine
Flora of the Democratic Republic of the Congo
Flora of Cabinda Province
Flora of Angola
Flora of Namibia
Plants described in 1888